The Medje free-tailed bat (Mops congicus) is a species of bat in the family Molossidae. It is found in Cameroon, Democratic Republic of the Congo, and Uganda. Its natural habitats are subtropical or tropical dry forests and subtropical or tropical moist lowland forests.

Taxonomy
It was described as a new species in 1917 by Joel Asaph Allen. The holotype was collected in 1910 by Herbert Lang and James Chapin near the town of Medje in what was then Belgian Congo.

References

Mops (bat)
Taxonomy articles created by Polbot
Bats of Africa
Mammals described in 1917
Taxa named by Joel Asaph Allen